Jackie Hughes (born 13 December 1923) was a professional boxer from Wales. Born in Pontypridd, Glamorgan, Hughes was notable for becoming the Welsh featherweight champion in 1949, defending the title successfully twice.

Notes

External links
 

1923 births
Possibly living people
Welsh male boxers
Featherweight boxers
Sportspeople from Pontypridd